FKT may refer to:

 Falkland Islands Time
 Fastest known time, to complete a route
 FKT algorithm, in graph theory
 FK Tønsberg, a Norwegian football club